Leila Zelli (born 1981) is an Iranian-Canadian artist. Zelli was born in Tehran, and lives and works in Montreal, Quebec.

In 2018, Zelli participated in the 36th International Symposium of Contemporary Art and was chosen "favorite artist" by the public. Zelli took part in the "Empreintes" residency at the Montreal Museum of Fine Arts in 2019. In 2021, Zelli received the Claudine and Stephen Bronfman Fellowship in Contemporary Arts.

Her work is included in the collections of the Musée national des beaux-arts du Québec, Musée d’art contemporain de Montréal and the Musée des beaux-arts de Montréal.

References

Living people
1981 births
21st-century Canadian women artists
Artists from Tehran